Eino Ilmari Oksanen (7 May 1931 – 10 August 2022) was a Finnish marathon runner who won the Boston Marathon three times (1959, 1961 and 1962). Oksanen also won the 1957 Turku Marathon in Finland and the 1959 Athens Peace Marathon.

See also
 List of winners of the Boston Marathon

References

General references 
 https://www.arrs.run/HP_AtEMa.htm
 https://www.arrs.run/HP_PNTMa.htm
 https://web.archive.org/web/20070909174516/http://arrs.net/ATM_Mara1956.htm

External links 
 

1931 births
2022 deaths
Sportspeople from Jyväskylä
Finnish male long-distance runners
Athletes (track and field) at the 1956 Summer Olympics
Athletes (track and field) at the 1960 Summer Olympics
Athletes (track and field) at the 1964 Summer Olympics
Olympic athletes of Finland
Boston Marathon male winners
20th-century Finnish people
21st-century Finnish people